is a city in western Chiba Prefecture, Japan. , the city had an estimated population of 491,716 in 251,142 households and a population density of 8559 persons per km2. The city has a concentration of the wide-area traffic network that connects the center of Tokyo with many areas of Chiba Prefecture. Major rail routes and roads pass through the city.

Geography
Ichikawa is located in the northwestern part of Chiba prefecture, about 20 kilometers from the prefectural capital at Chiba and  within 10 to 20 kilometers from the center of Tokyo. The western border of the city is separated from Edogawa Ward of Tokyo by the Edogawa River.  The southern part of the city is an alluvial plain about two meters above sea level, and the northern part is part of the gentle Shimosa Plateau rising about 20 meters above sea level. The highest point is 30.1 meters in Satomi Park. Parts of the city are on reclaimed land at sea level.

Surrounding municipalities
Chiba Prefecture
Urayasu
Funabashi
Matsudo
Kamagaya
Tokyo Metropolis
Edogawa

Climate
Ichikawa has a humid subtropical climate (Köppen Cfa) characterized by warm summers and cool winters with light to no snowfall.  The average annual temperature in Ichikawa is 15.4 °C. The average annual rainfall is 1404 mm with September as the wettest month. The temperatures are highest on average in August, at around 27.0 °C, and lowest in January, at around 4.9 °C.

Demographics
Per Japanese census data, the population of Ichikawa has increased fifteen-fold over the past century.

History
The area around present-day Ichikawa has been inhabited since the Japanese Paleolithic period. Archaeologists have found stone tools dating to some 30,000 years ago. Numerous shell middens from the Jōmon period, and hundreds of burial tumuli from the Kofun period have been found in numerous locations around Ichikawa. During the Nara period, Ichikawa was the provincial capital of Shimōsa Province and is mentioned in the Man'yōshū.  During the Heian period, this area was the center of the rebellion by Taira Masakado.  During the Sengoku period, it was the site of a major battles (Battle of Kōnodai) between the Satomi clan and the Later Hōjō clan.

In more recent history, the area was also the site of some minor battles during the Boshin War of the Meiji Restoration and was promoted as a possible site for the new Diet of Japan by Katsu Kaishu, who envisioned a structure to be built on the Edogawa River similar to the Houses of Parliament in London along the River Thames. Ichikawa Town was organized in 1889 with the creation of the modern municipalities system. On November 3, 1934 Ichikawa merged with the neighboring towns of Yawata, Nakayama and village of Kokubun to form the city of Ichikawa. The city expanded by annexing the village of Okashiwa on November 3, 1949, the town of Gyotoku on March 31, 1955 and town of Minami-Gyotoku on October 1, 1956.

Government
Ichikawa has a mayor-council form of government with a directly elected mayor and a unicameral city council of 42 members. Ichikawa contributes six members to the Chiba Prefectural Assembly. In terms of national politics, the city is divided between the Chiba 5th district and the Chiba 6th district of the lower house of the Diet of Japan.

Economy
Ichikawa during the Meiji period was considered a desirable location for politicians, industrialists and many cultural figures, and had the highest assessed land prices in Chiba Prefecture. Many modern writers and poets have either lived in Ichikawa, or had written works set in Ichikawa, including Soseki Natsume, Shiki Masaoka, Akiko Yosano, Yukio Mishima, Nagai Kafu, Hisashi Inoue and Koda Rohan. The area around Ichikawa Station and Motoyawata Station later developed into  a commercial area with many high-rise condominiums, commercial facilities, and companies. The area around Motoyawata Station is also an administrative center where many city facilities such as the city hall are located.

The Gyotoku district in the south is an area which once had salt pans in the Edo Period, but was transformed in modern times into new town developments with good access to Tokyo via the Tokyo Metro Tozai Line. The bay area along the Keiyo Line and Japan National Route 357 (Metropolitan Expressway Bayshore Line / Higashi Kanto Expressway) is an industrial area as part of the Tokyo-Chiba industrial zone, and is a distribution base where factories and warehouses of various companies are lined up.

Transportation

Railway
 JR East – Sōbu Line (Rapid)

 JR East – Chūō-Sōbu Line
 -  
 JR East – Musashino Line

 JR East – Keiyō Line
 - 
 Keisei Electric Railway  - Keisei Main Line
 -   -  -  -  
 Tokyo Metropolitan Bureau of Transportation  - Shinjuku Line
 
 Tokyo Metro  -  Tōzai Line
    -  -  
 Hokusō Railway  - Hokusō Line
  - < -  - > -

Highway
 
 
  Bayshore Route

Education

Universities
Chiba University of Commerce
Wayo Women's University
Tokyo Medical and Dental University (Ichikawa campus)
Showagakuin Junior College
Tokyo Management College

Primary and secondary schools
Ichikawa has 39 public elementary schools and three private elementary schools. The city has 27 public middle schools and five private combined middle/high schools, including Ichikawa Gakuen. The city also has seven public high schools and two private high schools.

Twin towns

Ichikawa is twinned with:

 Gardena, United States (1962)
 Issy-les-Moulineaux, France (2012)
 Leshan, China (1981)
 Medan, Indonesia (1989)
 Rosenheim, Germany (2004)

Local attractions
 Nakayama Hokekyō-ji: A Buddhist temple with several national important cultural assets, including a gate and a Hokke-dō Hall from the Sengoku period and a Five-story Pagoda built in 1622.
 Katsushika Hachiman Shrine: A Shinto shrine built in the Heian period.
 Osu Disaster Prevention Park: Usually used as a recreation and relaxation site, this park is designated as a temporary evacuation and rescue site in times of disaster.
 Satomi Park: One of Ichikawa's main parks, Satomi Park stands on the hilly part of Konōdai, with the Edo River running below. It is famous for its cherry trees.
 Wild Bird Observatory: This facility is equipped with observation telescopes, and it has an exhibition room which is open to visitors.
 Zoological & Botanical Garden: This garden houses 70 species of animals, mainly small animals such as lesser pandas and orangutans. Nearby is the Natural Museum, Nature Park (Rose Garden), Youth Nature House (Planetarium), and privately managed athletic facilities.
 Teramachi-dori: Formerly called "Narita-michi" ("Narita Road"), this street was once used by pilgrims on their way to Narita-san Temple.
 Guhō-ji and the nearby Mama Well of Kamei-in, mentioned in Takahashi Mushimaro's poem in the Man'yōshū.
 Higashiyama Kaii Memorial Hall: Designed based on Germany, where Higashiyama studied, this two-story building is European in appearance with an octagonal tower.
 Lifelong Learning Center: Nicknamed "Media Park Ichikawa," this center supports learning for everyone from infants to seniors. The center's main attraction is the Central Library, along with the Audio Visual and Children's Hall.
 Clean Spa Ichikawa: Powered by heat from garbage incineration, this facility provides a swimming pool, warm bath, and gymnastic equipment.

Noted people from Ichikawa
Masa Takanashi, professional wrestler
Sakaigawa Namiemon, Meiji period sumo wrestler
Wakashima Gonshirō, Meiji period sumo wrestler
Kōji Nakano, novelist
Kuniko Inoguchi, Cabinet minister
Michio Hoshino, photographer
Kazuki Kosakai, comedian
Yūko Andō, newscaster
Koji Ishikawa, illustrator
Taiji, musician
yukihiro (musician), musician
Kazuo Takahashi, mixed martial artist
Shigeki Maruyama, professional golfer
Oginishiki Yasutoshi – sumo wrestler
Tomo Sakurai, Voice actress
Tōki Susumu, sumo wrestler
Ryoji Aikawa, professional baseball player
Ryoji Aikawa, professional soccer player
Kazushige Nosawa, professional wrestler
G.G. Sato, professional baseball player
Moe Oshikiri, fashion model
Yuki Abe, professional soccer player
Atsuko Maeda, singer, actress, former member of AKB48
Norimitsu Onishi, Journalist
Tatsuhisa Suzuki, Voice actor
Peter Takeo Okada, Roman Catholic Archbishop of Tokyo
Yoko Narahashi, film producer and casting director
Tao Okamoto, actress and model
Yoshino Takamori, Voice actress

References

External links

Official Website 

 
Cities in Chiba Prefecture
Populated places established in 1934
1934 establishments in Japan